

Wilhelm von Lengerke (17 June 1894 – 26 August 1942) was a general in the Wehrmacht of Nazi Germany during World War II. He was a recipient of the Knight's Cross of the Iron Cross. Lengerke was killed 26 August 1942 during the Battle of Stalingrad. He was posthumously promoted to Generalmajor. He is now buried in Lüneburg, Germany.

Awards and decorations

 Knight's Cross of the Iron Cross on 31 August 1941 as Oberstleutnant and commander of 1./Reiter-Regiment 1

Notes

References

 

1894 births
1942 deaths
People from Greifswald
People from the Province of Pomerania
Major generals of the German Army (Wehrmacht)
German Army personnel of World War I
Recipients of the clasp to the Iron Cross, 1st class
Recipients of the Knight's Cross of the Iron Cross
German Army personnel killed in World War II
Military personnel from Mecklenburg-Western Pomerania
German commanders at the Battle of Stalingrad
German Army generals of World War II